Prisoners of the Sun is a video game based on The Seven Crystal Balls and Prisoners of the Sun from the series The Adventures of Tintin, the comics series by Belgian cartoonist Hergé. It was released for the SNES, Windows, Game Boy and Game Boy Color by late 1997 and 2000.

Gameplay

Prisoners of the Sun is a Platform game. The player controls the character Tintin around obstacles and through challenges to complete the various levels of the game. The gameplay and animation of this game is similar to Infogrames' previous release, Tintin in Tibet, which was released in 1995.

Release
It was released in 1997 for PC, SNES and Game Boy and later re-released in 2000 for Game Boy Color.

References

External links
 Prisoners of the Sun at Tintinologist.org

1997 video games
Game Boy Color games
Role-playing video games
Super Nintendo Entertainment System games
Video games based on Tintin
Video games scored by Alberto Jose González
Windows games
Video games developed in France
Infogrames games
Single-player video games
Promethean Designs games
Video games set in Peru